Vexillum taeniatum, common name: the ribboned mitre,  is a species of small sea snail, marine gastropod mollusk in the family Costellariidae, the ribbed miters.

Description
The shell size varies between 38 mm and 85 mm.

Distribution
This species is distributed in the Indian Ocean along Madagascar and in the Pacific Ocean along the Philippines, Indonesia, Fiji, Papua New Guinea and in the Gulf of Thailand.

References

 Dautzenberg, Ph. (1929). Mollusques testacés marins de Madagascar. Faune des Colonies Francaises, Tome III
 Turner H. 2001. Katalog der Familie Costellariidae Macdonald, 1860. Conchbooks. 1-100 page(s): 63

External links
 Gastropods.com : Vexillum (Vexillum) taeniatum; accessed : 15 December 2010
  Liénard, Élizé. Catalogue de la faune malacologique de l'île Maurice et de ses dépendances comprenant les îles Seychelles, le groupe de Chagos composé de Diego-Garcia, Six-îles, Pèros-Banhos, Salomon, etc., l'île Rodrigues, l'île de Cargados ou Saint-Brandon. J. Tremblay, 1877.
  Cernohorsky, Walter Oliver. The Mitridae of Fiji; The veliger vol. 8 (1965)

taeniatum
Gastropods described in 1811